Lycée Saint-Joseph-de-Tivoli, commonly called "Tivoli", is a private Catholic elementary and secondary school with technical college, located in Bordeaux, in the Gironde department of France. The school was founded by the Society of Jesus in 1850.

High school ranking 
In 2015, the high school ranked 2nd among 46 at the departmental level, in terms of teaching quality, and 95th at the national level.

Notable alumni 
 Martial Piéchaud (1888-1957)
 François de Vial (1904-1985)

See also

 Catholic Church in France
 Education in France
 List of Jesuit schools

References

Jesuit secondary schools in France
1850 establishments in France
Educational institutions established in 1850
Jesuit elementary and primary schools in France
Schools in Bordeaux